Les Agudes is a mountain of Catalonia, Spain. It has an elevation of 1,706 metres above sea level. It is straddling the municipalities of Arbúcies in the Selva comarca and Fogars de Montclús and Montseny in the Vallès Oriental. 

The wooded north-east slope was crash site of Dan-Air Flight 1903, which occurred on Friday, 3 July 1970.

See also
Mountains of Catalonia

Mountains of Catalonia
One-thousanders of Spain